Daria Charochkina (born October 7, 1990) is a Russian chess player, and a woman grandmaster.

She qualified for the Women's World Chess Championship 2017, but went out in the first round.

External links 

Living people
Chess woman grandmasters
1990 births
Russian female chess players